Andy Kravitz is an American drummer and percussionist, audio engineer, record producer, and songwriter. He has been nominated for 14 Grammy Awards, winning several. He lives near Venice Beach in Los Angeles, California.

Early life
Andy Kravitz was born in Philadelphia, Pennsylvania.

Career
In 1992, Kravitz played with Kris Kross on Totally Krossed Out, and with former Fleetwood Mac guitarist and singer Rick Vito on his debut solo album, King of Hearts, on the songs "Desireé" and "Honey Love". In 1993, he produced Urge Overkill's fourth album, Saturation. In 1995, Kravitz played with Joan Osborne on her second album, Relish, and co-produced Dishwalla's debut album, Pet Your Friends. In 1996, he played with Cypress Hill on their EP, Unreleased and Revamped. In 1998, Kravitz played with Imogen Heap on her debut album, iMegaphone. In 1999, he co-produced Simon Townshend's album, Animal Soup.

In 2000, Kravitz co-produced Juliana Hatfield's fourth album, Beautiful Creature. In 2010, he played with a local free jazz group formed by Warren Cuccurullo called Theoretical 5 in Mar Vista, Los Angeles with Frank Zappa alumni Arthur Barrow (bass), Tommy Mars (keyboards, vocals), and Larry Klimas (saxophone). In 2011, Kravitz collaborated with Michael Tearson and Tom Hampton on Tearson's debut album, Stuff That Works.

New White Trash
New White Trash was a downtempo acoustic rock band formed by Kravitz and Michael Ruppert, singer Kristen Vigard, and guitarist Doug Lewis. The band released two albums, Doublewide (2011) and Age of Authority (2013). Following Ruppert's suicide in 2014, the band announced its intention to release a tribute album. Beyond the Rubicon was released on December 11, 2014.

Charts and awards
, reached #7 on Billboard's Top World Music Albums and #40 on Top Heatseekers.
, peaked at #1 on the Billboard 200 and was nominated for Album of the Year.
, reached #2 on Top Heatseekers and #146 on the Billboard 200.
, reached #48 on the Billboard 200 and was nominated for Best Contemporary Folk Album.
, reached #1 on Top Heatseekers and #9 on the Billboard 200 and was nominated for Album of the Year.

Selected discography
Drums and percussion

 ("Love Is Strong (Joe the Butcher Club Remix)")

Producer

Lana Del Rey (2008). "Come When You Call Me America" Unreleased.

Writer
Lana Del Rey (2008). "Come When You Call Me America" Unreleased.

Videos

Notes

References

External links

Andy Kravitz blog at Modern Drummer

1966 births
Living people
American male drummers
American male singer-songwriters
American rock drummers
Musicians from Los Angeles
Musicians from Philadelphia
Record producers from California
Record producers from Pennsylvania
Singer-songwriters from California
Singer-songwriters from Pennsylvania